The 2016 National (branded as the 2016 BOOST National for sponsorship reasons) was held from December 6 to 11 at the Essar Centre in Sault Ste. Marie, Ontario. This was the third Grand Slam of Curling event of the 2016–17 curling season.

On the men's side, the defending Olympic champion Brad Jacobs rink won their second career Grand Slam event. The team won the event on home ice, as they are from the Soo. To win, they defeated the Reid Carruthers rink from Manitoba, who had just come from winning the 2016 Canada Cup of Curling a week earlier.

On the women's side, the Manitoba-based Kerri Einarson rink won their first career Grand Slam event, defeating the Silvana Tirinzoni team from Switzerland in the final. Both the Jacobs and Einarson rink took home $30,000 for their championship wins.

Qualification
The top 14 men's and women's team on the World Curling Tour's "Order of Merit" rankings as of October 31 qualify, plus a sponsor exemption.

Men's ranking as of Oct. 31.

 Brad Gushue
 Kevin Koe
 Reid Carruthers
 Niklas Edin
 John Epping
 Brad Jacobs
 Mike McEwen
 Steve Laycock
 David Murdoch
 Charley Thomas
 John Morris
 Brendan Bottcher
 Thomas Ulsrud
 Peter de Cruz
 John Shuster

Tanner Horgan's rink from Sudbury, Ontario was invited as a sponsor exemption. His team was ranked 64th and was the 2nd best team from Northern Ontario after Brad Jacobs. 

Women's ranking as of Oct. 31.

 Rachel Homan
 Jennifer Jones
 Silvana Tirinzoni
 Eve Muirhead
 Valerie Sweeting
 Allison Flaxey
 Chelsea Carey
 Anna Hasselborg
 Kelsey Rocque
 Anna Sidorova
 Kim Eun-jung
 Tracy Fleury
 Kerri Einarson
 Binia Feltscher

Krista McCarville's rink from Thunder Bay, Ontario was invited as a sponsor exemption. Her team was ranked 22nd and was the 2nd best team from Northern Ontario after Tracy Fleury.

Men

Teams

Round-robin standings
Final round-robin standings

Tiebreakers

Playoffs

Quarterfinals

Semifinals

Finals

Women

Teams

Round-robin standings
Final round-robin standings

Tiebreakers

Playoffs

Quarterfinals

Semifinals

Finals

Notes

References

External links

2016
December 2016 sports events in Canada
2016 in Canadian curling
Sport in Sault Ste. Marie, Ontario
Curling in Northern Ontario
2016 in Ontario